Ernest Glanville (5 May 1855 in Wynberg – 6 September 1925 in Rondebosch) was a South African author, known especially for his short stories which are widely read and taught in South Africa. He also wrote seventeen historical novels.

Glanville was educated at St. Andrew's College, Grahamstown from January 1869 to May 1871. His schooling was interrupted when he and his father transported the first printing press from Grahamstown to Griqualand West by ox wagon in 1870 and began publishing a newspaper in Kimberley. In addition to his literary works, he worked in journalism for the Cape Argus and other newspapers, and collaborated with Dr MacGowan on the 1905 Jubilee Hymn.  He was married to Emma Priscilla Powell, with whom he had four children—Thomas Burt, Ada Hoole, John, and Denis Gordon.

Publications 

 Among The Cape Kaffirs, 1888
 The Lost Heiress, 1891
 The Fossicker, 1892
 A Fair Colonist, 1894
 The Golden Rock, 1895
 Kloof Yarns, 1896
 Tales From The Veld, 1897
 The Kloof Bride, 1898
 The Inca's Treasure, 1899
 The Despatch Rider, 1900
 Max Thornton, 1901
 The Lost Regiment, 1901
 A Beautiful Rebel, 1902
 The Commandant, 1902
 The Diamond Seekers, 1903
 
 A Rough Reformer, 1905
 Tyopa, 1920
 Through the Red Revolt on the Rand, 1922
 Claw And Fang, 1923
 The Yellow-Maned Lion, 1925
 The Hunter, 1926

References

External links 
 
 

1855 births
1925 deaths
South African male novelists
South African male short story writers
South African short story writers
Alumni of St. Andrew's College, Grahamstown